Derby (German: Derby. Ein Ausschnitt aus der Welt des Trabersports) is a 1926 German silent sports film directed by Max Reichmann and starring Barbara von Annenkoff, Henry Stuart and Grete Mosheim. The film's sets were designed by Erich Zander. It was based on a novel of the same title by Ernst Klein.

Cast
 Barbara von Annenkoff as Kitty Roy
 Henry Stuart as Baron von Reiffenberg
 Alexandra Nalder as Liesel, seine Tochter
 Otto Wallburg as Emil Henschke, Fleischwaren en gros
 Grete Mosheim as Edith, seine Tochter
 Franz Lingner as Arpad Varady
 Gerd Fricke as Alf Winkfield
 Robert Leffler as Claren
 Max Nosseck

References

Bibliography
 Hans-Michael Bock & Claudia Lenssen. ''Joe May: Regisseur und Produzent. 1991.

External links

1926 films
Films of the Weimar Republic
German silent feature films
Films directed by Max Reichmann
Films based on Austrian novels
German horse racing films
Films produced by Joe May
German black-and-white films
Phoebus Film films
1920s sports films
German sports films
1920s German films
1920s German-language films
Silent sports films